Songs for Tibet: The Art of Peace is a music album with contributions from a number of musicians from throughout the world, including the United States, the United Kingdom, Canada, and South Africa. The artists include Sting, Garbage, Rush, Suzanne Vega, Jonatha Brooke, and Alanis Morissette. The album is an initiative to support Tibet, the promotion of peace, basic fundamental human rights, including freedom of speech and religion and the 14th Dalai Lama, Tenzin Gyatso. Songs for Tibet is a project from the Art of Peace Foundation in Washington, D.C. The executive director of the Art of Peace Foundation, Michael Wohl, is executive producer of the album. Producer Rupert Hine oversaw the musical direction of the project.

Songs for Tibet was released to coincide with the start of the Beijing 2008 Summer Olympics on August 8, 2008. The album was released on iTunes August 5, 2008, and the CD was made available August 19.

On August 5, 2008, the Art of Peace Foundation released the video "Songs for Tibet: Freedom Is Expression," which was directed by Mark Pellington. The  video can be seen on YouTube and on the Art of Peace Foundation's website.

Songs for Tibet was the No. 1 Rock Album on iTunes in the United States, France, Canada, Italy, and the Netherlands. The producer of the album, the Art of Peace Foundation, alleged that China had blocked its residents from the iTunes Music Store after the album became a hit. The track "Hope" by Rush was nominated for Best Rock Instrumental Performance at the 2008 Grammy Awards.

Track listing

References

External links
Official Art of Peace Foundation site

Politics of Tibet
Charity albums
Political music albums
Collaborative albums
2008 compilation albums
2008 Summer Olympics
Pop compilation albums
Rock compilation albums
Songs about Tibet